William Thomas Hodgins (February 27, 1857 – December 3, 1909) was a farmer and political figure in Ontario, Canada. He represented Carleton in the House of Commons of Canada from 1891 to 1900 as a Conservative member.

He was born in Goulbourn Township, Canada West, the son of John Hodgins and Sarah Jane Kidd. His grandfather William Hodgins, an Irish immigrant, was one of the first settlers in Carleton County. Hodgins served as a member of the municipal council for Goulbourn township in 1888. He died in Goulbourn township at the age of 52.

References 

1857 births
1909 deaths
Members of the House of Commons of Canada from Ontario
Conservative Party of Canada (1867–1942) MPs